A special election was held in  in 1827 to fill a vacancy caused by the resignation of John Forsyth (J).

Background
From 1792 to 1824, Georgia had elected its representatives at-large.  In 1826, for that election only, Georgia switched to using districts.  In the new 2nd district, John Forsyth was re-elected to a 3rd term.  Some time after the election, Forsyth resigned, having been elected Governor, and a special election was held for his replacement.

Election results

Wilde took his seat on January 14, 1828

See also
List of special elections to the United States House of Representatives

References

Georgia 1827 02
Georgia 1827 02
1827 02
Georgia 02
1827 Georgia (U.S. state) elections
United States House of Representatives 1827 02